The Ashwood Avenue Historic District, also known as Ashwood Avenue Historic District, in Pewee Valley, Kentucky, is a  historic district which was listed on the National Register of Historic Places in 1989.  It included 13 contributing buildings.

The district includes nine houses along Ash Ave. from La Grange Rd. to Elm Ave. in Pewee Valley, specifically numbers 100, 106, 110, 111, 112, 115, 116, 117 & 121 Ash Ave.

References

Historic districts on the National Register of Historic Places in Kentucky
Queen Anne architecture in Kentucky
Colonial Revival architecture in Kentucky
Houses completed in 1890
National Register of Historic Places in Oldham County, Kentucky
Houses in Oldham County, Kentucky
Neighborhoods in Kentucky
Buildings and structures in Pewee Valley, Kentucky